The Wild Goose Chase is a 1915 American comedy-drama film directed by Cecil B. DeMille. The film was written by DeMille's brother William and starred Ina Claire. The Wild Goose Chase is now considered a lost film.

Cast
 Ina Claire as Betty Wright
 Lucien Littlefield as The 'grind'
 Helen Marlborough as Mrs. Wright
 Raymond Hatton as Mr. Wright
 Tom Forman as Bob Randall
 Ernest Joy as Mr. Randall
 Theodore Roberts as Horatio Brutus Bangs
 Tex Driscoll (uncredited)
 Mrs. Lewis McCord (uncredited)
 Florence Smythe as Mrs. Randall (uncredited)
 Jane Wolfe (uncredited)

See also
List of lost films

References

External links

1915 films
1915 comedy-drama films
1915 lost films
American silent feature films
American black-and-white films
Films directed by Cecil B. DeMille
Lost American films
Lost comedy-drama films
Paramount Pictures films
1910s American films
Silent American comedy-drama films
1910s English-language films